Ukatnyy or Ukatny is an island in the northern Caspian Sea. It is located off the eastern end of the mouths of the Volga.

Ukatnyy Island is marshy. It has a length of 6.2 km and a maximum width of 4.3 km. It lies in an offshore oil producing area.

Ukatnyy is a disputed island. According to Russia administratively this island belongs to the Astrakhan Oblast of the Russian Federation, but Kazakhstan had assumed the island was part of its historical territory and includes it in its Atyrau Region.  
Other disputed islands near Ukatny are the following:
Zhestky (Ostrov Zhestky) . Located about 8 km to the WSW of Ukatny's southern tip.
Maly Zhemchuzhny . More a sandbank than a proper island.

See also
List of territorial disputes

References

External links
Astra - a quiet evening in the Caspian Sea near the island of Ukatny
КАСПИЙСКИЙ САММИТ НЕ СОСТОЯЛСЯ

Atyrau Region
Islands of Astrakhan Oblast
Islands of the Caspian Sea
Islands of Kazakhstan
Kazakhstan–Russia border
Territorial disputes of Kazakhstan
Territorial disputes of Russia
Disputed islands